The Last Escape, also known as O.S.S., is a 1970 American-West German international co-production war film directed by Walter Grauman and starring Stuart Whitman, John Collin and Martin Jarvis. It was filmed by Oakmont Productions for Mirisch Productions near Munich in 1968 but not released until 1970.

Interiors were shot at the Bavaria Studios in Munich. The film's sets were designed by the art director Rolf Zehetbauer.

Plot 

During the Second World War, American Captain Lee Mitchell (Stuart Whitman) and a group of British commandos attempt to locate and kidnap the leading German rocket scientist Dr. Von Heinken (Pinkas Braun). Along the way they are chased by SS and Soviet forces who were also after him.

Cast

Novelization
A paperback novelization of the screenplay was written by the ubiquitous and popular pulpsmith, Michael Avallone, under the publisher's "house" (shared) pseudonym, "Max Walker." (Contrary to any other assertion, this is the only time Avallone's work was published under the Walker by-line.) The publisher was Popular Library and the cover price was 60¢.

See also
 List of American films of 1970
 Operation Paperclip

References

External links

1970 films
1970 war films
West German films
English-language German films
Eastern Front of World War II films
Films shot in Germany
Films set in Germany
War adventure films
American World War II films
German World War II films
Office of Strategic Services in fiction
United Artists films
Films directed by Walter Grauman
Films shot at Bavaria Studios
1970s English-language films
1970s American films
1970s German films